Laila Taher born Sherouette Moustafa Ibrahim is an Egyptian film, stage, television actress and presenter who is mostly known for her successful collaborations with Salah Zulfikar in film, television and theater. She participated in over hundred artworks through her career mostly in television. In films, Laila Taher is known for her notable roles in; Saladin the Victorious (1963), Soft Hands (1963), A Husband on Vacation (1964), The Peacock (1982) and Monsieur le Directeur (1988).

Early life 
Sherouette Moustafa Ibrahim was born on 13 March 1942 in Cairo to an Egyptian family, her father was an agricultural engineer and her mother a housewife. Her family took care of her education until she obtained a bachelor's degree in social work.

Career 
She holds a bachelor's degree in social work and was supposed to be a social worker, as her father had planned, but her tendency to acting while studying at the university prevented her parents from achieving her plan.

The life of fame as a TV presenter began with the beginning of the Egyptian television broadcast in 1960, where she was collected by many meetings and situations with the television director Robert Sayegh, who was one of the first generation of television directors, as he helped and encouraged her and her family until she became a successful broadcaster to present many important programs. The most prominent of which was the (TV Magazine) program, which was presented for a long time even after Ramses Naguib discovered and chose her stage name from the heroines of Ihsan Abdel Quddous's novels.

She chose Laila for her love and intense love for the late singer Laila Mourad, and she says about herself: My beginning in the Egyptian cinema was through Abu Hadid (1958), in which I played a supporting the role with actor Farid Shawqi. After she refused to be hired as a full-time television presenter she became a full time actress.

Her real breakthrough to fame was in 1964, when she paired with actor and producer Salah Zulfikar who was popularly known as "Fares al Ahlem" [Knight of dreams] and she won her first leading role opposite Zulfikar in A Husband on Vacation (1964). Taher says about this film: It is one of the most important films of my career, in addition to Soft Hands (1963) and Saladin (1963). She formed a lovely duet with Zulfikar in over twenty artworks in film, television and in stage. In 2021, she announced her full retirement from acting.

Personal life 
She married six times, and her first husband was Mohamed El-Sherbiny, with whom she gave birth to her only son, Ahmed. After their separation, she married director Hussein Fawzy, then she was divorced  and married journalist Nabil Esmat. After her divorce, she married actor Yousuf Shaaban and separated from him and married music composer Khaled Al-Amir. After her separation from him, she married her last husband outside movie business.

Selected filmography

Films 

 1958: Abu Hadid
 1960: Love and Adoration
 1960: Ya Habibi
 1961: El Hub Keda
 1961: Waheeda
 1961: The Sun Will Never Set
 1962: Struggle of the Heroes
 1963: Saladin the Victorious
 1963: Soft Hands
 1963: Hero till the End
 1964: A Husband on Vacation
 1965: Artistic Director
 1971: Confessions of a Woman
 1975: I Want a Solution
 1981: Al Qadisiyya
 1982: The Peacock
 1984: The Addict
 1987: I Wanted to Apologize
 1988: Red Mourning Clothes
 1988: Monsieur le Directeur
 1989: Mr Aliwa's Apartment
 1992: Anything But My Daughter
 2008: Ramadan Mabrouk Abu al-Alamein Hamouda

On stage 

 1964: A Bullet in the Heart
 1966: Afifi's Loves
 1973: A Man for Every Home
 1983: The Marital Happiness Trap
 1986: Watch out, couples!
 1988: The Lost Day

Television 

 1979: The Searcher
 1982: Detective Inspector
 1990: The Family of Mr Shalash
 1991: The Peacock
 2009: Monsieur Ramadan Mabrouk.

References

External links 

 
 Laila Taher on ElCinema

1942 births
Egyptian film actresses
Egyptian television actresses
Egyptian stage actresses
Egyptian Muslims
Actresses from Cairo
Living people